Láhpoluoppal Chapel is a chapel of the Church of Norway in Kautokeino Municipality in Troms og Finnmark county, Norway. It is located in the village of Láhpoluoppal. It is an annex chapel for the Kautokeino parish which is part of the Indre Finnmark prosti (deanery) in the Diocese of Nord-Hålogaland.

The mountain church has clear and simple lines. The building was constructed out of brick with a few small windows. The church has a square-shaped ground plan and is topped by a pyramid roof with a skylight window. The church was built in 1967 using plans by the architect Nils Henrik Eggen. The church seats about 70 people.

See also
List of churches in Nord-Hålogaland

References

Kautokeino
Churches in Finnmark
Brick churches in Norway
20th-century Church of Norway church buildings
Churches completed in 1967
1967 establishments in Norway
Long churches in Norway